Mount Tyndall is a peak in the Mount Whitney region of the Sierra Nevada in the U.S. state of California.  At , it is the tenth highest peak in the state.  The mountain was named in honor of the Irish scientist and mountaineer, John Tyndall.

Geography
Tyndall lies on the Sierra Crest, which in this region forms the boundary between the John Muir Wilderness and the Inyo National Forest on the east, and Sequoia National Park on the west; and the boundary between Inyo and Tulare counties.

History
Mount Tyndall was first climbed on July 6, 1864, by Clarence King and Richard Cotter who were members of the California Geological Survey and under the overall direction of Josiah Whitney and the field leadership of William Brewer. King and Cotter were attempting to make the first ascent of Mount Whitney, and had made a long trek from Kings Canyon, only to realize months later that they had climbed the wrong peak.

Climbing routes
The easiest route on Mount Tyndall in terms of access and climbing is the Northwest Ridge, which involves an easy scramble. Other non-technical routes exist on the gently sloped west side of the peak. At least two significant technical routes lie on the much steeper east face; the first of these routes was climbed by noted mountaineer Fred Beckey and Charlie Raymond in 1970.

See also
 List of California fourteeners

References

External links
 
  In Chapter 3 of the free online version of this book, King gives an account of the first ascent of Mount Tyndall.

Fourteeners of California
Mountains of Sequoia National Park
Mountains of the John Muir Wilderness
Mountains of Inyo County, California
Mountains of Tulare County, California